Group D was one of four groups of national teams competing at the 2010 Africa Cup of Nations. The group's first round of matches began on January 10 and its last matches were played on January 18. Most matches were played at the Estádio Alto da Chela in Lubango and featuring Zambia, Mali, Tunisia, and  Cameroon. This was a very tight group with three teams being level on four points and the Tunisians being undefeated but eliminated.

Standings

Cameroon vs Gabon

Zambia vs Tunisia

Gabon vs Tunisia

Cameroon vs Zambia

Gabon vs Zambia

Cameroon vs Tunisia

Group
2009–10 in Tunisian football
2010 in Cameroonian football
2010 in Gabonese sport
2010 in Zambian sport